Little Ethiopia may refer to:

 Little Ethiopia, Los Angeles, a neighborhood in Los Angeles, California, United States, known for its collection of Ethiopian American and Eritrean American community establishments 
 Little Ethiopia, Baltimore, a community in Baltimore, Maryland, United States, with a concentrated population of Ethiopian Americans
 Little Ethiopia (Washington, D.C.), a sub-division of the Shaw neighborhood in Washington, District of Columbia, United States